Eight Assembly elections took place in 2016:

England 
2016 London Assembly election

India 
2016 Assam Legislative Assembly election
2016 West Bengal Legislative Assembly election
2016 Kerala Legislative Assembly election
2016 Puducherry Legislative Assembly election
2016 Tamil Nadu Legislative Assembly election

Northern Ireland 
2016 Northern Ireland Assembly election

Wales 
2016 National Assembly for Wales election

See also 
List of elections in 2016